École secondaire Saint-Edmond is a public French-language  secondary school in Longueuil, Quebec, Canada. Its address is 346 Hubert Street in the borough of Greenfield Park.

External links
École secondaire Saint-Edmond 

High schools in Longueuil